Robert Peterson (born 15 May 1952) is a former Australian rules footballer who played with North Melbourne in the Victorian Football League (VFL).

Recruited from University High School, Peterson was both a rover and a forward. By making his debut at the age of just 16 and 45 days he became the youngest ever North Melbourne debutant. He kicked 26 goals in 1971, including a bag of seven against Geelong at Arden Street. His last league game was in the 1974 VFL Grand Final loss and he retired to pursue a medical career.

References

Holmesby, Russell and Main, Jim (2007). The Encyclopedia of AFL Footballers. 7th ed. Melbourne: Bas Publishing.

1952 births
Living people
Australian rules footballers from Victoria (Australia)
North Melbourne Football Club players